Bernardines may refer to:
Cistercians, a Roman Catholic religious order, sometimes called the Bernardines
Bernardine Cistercians of Esquermes, a small branch of the Cistercians
The name by which the Order of Friars Minor (Franciscan Observants) is known in the lands of the former Polish–Lithuanian Commonwealth, after Bernardino of Siena
Bernardine Sisters of St. Francis, a Roman Catholic religious order based in Pennsylvania, United States
The multi-ethnic mercenary army formerly commanded by German Protestant general Bernard of Saxe-Weimar during the Thirty Years' War, inherited by the French after his death

See also
Bernardine (disambiguation)
Bernadine (disambiguation)